Sally Ann may refer to:

 Sally Ann, Pennsylvania, an unincorporated community in Rockland Township, Berks County, Pennsylvania
 The Salvation Army
 "The Ballad of Sally Anne", a song with lyrics by Alice Randall to a traditional tune
 "Sally Ann", a 1959 song by The Chad Mitchell Trio
 "Sally Ann", a 1970 song by The Wild Angels
 "Sally Ann", a song by Rufus Wainwright, from the 1998 album Rufus Wainwright
 "Sally Ann (You're Such a Pretty Baby)", a 1969 song by The Cuff Links
 Sally–Anne test

See also